Rectimarginalis is a genus of Asian bush crickets of the tribe Holochlorini within the subfamily Phaneropterinae. Species are found in India, Indo-China, China, and Malesia:

Species
The Orthoptera Species File lists:
Rectimarginalis ensis (Haan, 1842)
Rectimarginalis fuscospinosa (Brunner von Wattenwyl, 1891) - type species(as Holochlora fusco-spinosa Brunner von Wattenwyl)
Rectimarginalis profunda Liu & Kang, 2007
Rectimarginalis traba (Ingrisch & Shishodia, 1998)

References

Phaneropterinae
Tettigoniidae genera
Orthoptera of Indo-China